The women's road time trial T1–2 road cycling event at the 2020 Summer Paralympics took place on 31 August 2021 around the Fuji Speedway in Shizuoka Prefecture. 11 riders from 8 nations competed in the race.

The T1–2 classification is for cyclists who have an impairment which affects their balance. They compete with a three-wheeled cycle called a tricycle - three wheels providing more balance than a standard two-wheeled cycle.

Results
The event was started on 31 August 2021 at 15:37.

Factors
T1 – 86.480
T2 – 100.00

References

Women's road time trial T1-2